Niggas' Revenge is a 2001 gay pornographic film produced and directed by Dick Wadd and starring Bobby Blake and Flex-Deon Blake in their last film together. In his autobiography My Life in Porn, Bobby Blake devoted a whole chapter to the film, explaining some of his motives and describing it as "an expensive movie and the most powerful movie of my life", adding, "It's also one of the most controversial adult films ever made, and that's what I wanted it to be - I had decided this was to be my last film, and I wanted to take it to the limit."

Synopsis 

Three neo-Nazi supremacists (Dallas Chalmers and his white "posse" Chane Adams and Bud Cockerham) go to the residence of the Blakes (Bobby Blake and his brother Chris Blake and Flex-Deon Blake) and shout racial slurs, harassing and bullying them in an attempt to get them to leave the neighborhood. However, the muscular black neighbors have finally had enough and get their revenge on the white harassers. They capture them and put them in a cage. Then they proceed to beat them up, urinate on them and sexually degrade and torture them until they completely break down and submit to the power of their black masters. The Blakes also invite Eric Top Stud, a light-skinned Puerto Rican stud to take part in abusing the neo-Nazis. There are also scenes of incest between Chris and Bobby Blake with Chris being the sole submissive black in the film.

Cast 

Tops
Bobby Blake
Flex-Deon Blake
Eric Top Stud (latino)
Versatile
Chris Blake (top and bottom)
Neo-nazi (white) bottoms
Chane Adams
Dallas Chalmers	
Bud Cockerham (credited as Bud)
Brief role
Crystal Blake (relative of the Blake "brothers")

Background 

Bobby Blake had decided to retire from his long-term career as a gay pornographic star. However, he had asked Dick Wadd before he quit to act in one last film with his ex-partner Flex-Deon Blake with no strings attached, where Bobby would be given the upper hand in doing whatever he pleased or fantasized. Most of the plot was reportedly left unscripted and entirely to the discretion of Bobby Blake who wanted to keep the element of surprise and apprehension on the rest of the characters in the film including the three submissive characters and the director. Whilst filming the movie, two of the white actors were reportedly concussed on set as a result of vigorous pounding and filming had to be stopped as the two men were brought round with proper hydration.

Bobby Blake explains in his autobiography My Life in Porn: The Bobby Blake Story in the chapter consecrated to Niggas' Revenge:

But Bobby Blake praised the three submissive white actors of the film for accepting to go on with no strings attached. In My Life in Porn he admits:

Bobby Blake also apologized for the unprotected sex of the film.

Reception

Critical response 

Robert Franklin of GayVN gave the film a three out of a possible five, and wrote that it "really pushes the envelope" and "is definitely not for the faint-hearted".

Academic analysis 

The film Niggas' Revenge has become the subject of serious academic discussion about race relations through sex and reversal of roles of oppressor and oppressed. In his book, Unlimited Intimacy: Reflections on the Subculture of Barebacking, Tim Dean, a professor at the University at Buffalo, treats Niggas' Revenge in detail that all in order, Dean argues, to "conjure the transgressive charge of unprotected anal sex among gay men", the film "fetishizes the simultaneous transgression of a number of taboos".

Dean analyzes the portrayal of racism in the movie:

On the troubling unprotected sex in the midst of the HIV epidemic, Dean says:
   
 
On fetishizing the black body represented in many interracial sex scenes, Dean explains:

The cultural prohibition on incestuous sex is also broken in the film, argues Dean.

Sequel 

In 2009, Dick Wadd filmed and released a sequel entitled Niggas' Revenge 2. None of the actors in the first film returned, instead a new cast of dominant blacks and neo-nazi submissives were featured. Four black men (Butch Blackmore, Jay Dupree, Jae C, and Ro) on a desert ranch finally have their fill of taunts by their neo-nazi neighbors (Rich Wrangler, Boy Fillmore, Jake Wetmore and Chris Kohl). So the blacks sneak up and capture the neo-nazis one by one and lock the white men in the chicken pen. Once locked up, the blacks proceed to beat, urinate on and verbally abuse their white captives as payback for their early taunts. The neo-nazis struggle and shout racial slurs against their black captors but they are ultimately powerless as they are spat on and grinded under the boots of the dominant blacks. Then they take the white men out one by one and sexually degrade them. They torture and anally rape the neo-nazis until they break down and submit to the power of their black masters. Mister H also makes an appearance telling the white men to shut up as they are being sodomized. 
Cast
Black tops
 Butch Blackmore
 Jay Dupree
 Jae C
 Ro
 Mister H
Neo-nazi white bottoms
 Boy Fillmore
 Jake Wetmore
 Rich Wrangler
 Chris Kohl

References

External links 
  for Niggas' Revenge
  for Niggas' Revenge 2
 
 
 
 

2001 films
Films about rape
Incest pornography
Films about racism
Bondage pornography
American films about revenge
African-American LGBT-related films
African-American films
American LGBT-related films
Gay pornographic films
2000s pornographic films
Pornographic film series
Pornographic horror films
American pornographic films
Direct-to-video film series
American direct-to-video films
Interracial pornographic films
Films about neo-Nazis
BDSM in films
2001 LGBT-related films
2000s English-language films
2000s American films